Galgupha is a genus of ebony bugs in the family Thyreocoridae. There are more than 30 described species in Galgupha.

Species
These 34 species belong to the genus Galgupha:

 Galgupha acuta McAtee & Malloch
 Galgupha anomala McAtee & Malloch
 Galgupha arizonensis (Van Duzee, 1923)
 Galgupha aterrima Malloch, 1919
 Galgupha atra Amyot & Serville, 1843
 Galgupha bakeri McAtee & Malloch, 1933
 Galgupha carinata McAtee & Malloch, 1933
 Galgupha costomaculata McAtee & Malloch
 Galgupha denudata (Uhler, 1863)
 Galgupha diminuta (Van Duzee, 1923)
 Galgupha dimorpha McAtee & Malloch
 Galgupha eas McAtee & Malloch, 1933
 Galgupha euryscytus
 Galgupha fritzi Kormilev
 Galgupha guttiger (Stål, 1862)
 Galgupha haywardi Kormilev
 Galgupha hesperia McAtee & Malloch, 1933
 Galgupha loboprostethia Sailer, 1940
 Galgupha lucretia McAtee & Malloch
 Galgupha mexicana McAtee & Malloch
 Galgupha morbiloci McAtee & Malloch
 Galgupha nitida McAtee & Malloch
 Galgupha nitiduloides (Wolff, 1802)
 Galgupha oblonga McAtee & Malloch
 Galgupha ovalis Hussey, 1925
 Galgupha parae McAtee & Malloch
 Galgupha punctata McAtee & Malloch
 Galgupha punctifer McAtee & Malloch, 1933
 Galgupha schutzii (Fabricius, 1781)
 Galgupha singularis McAtee & Malloch
 Galgupha texana McAtee & Malloch, 1933
 Galgupha triconcava McAtee & Malloch
 Galgupha unica McAtee & Malloch
 Galgupha vinculata McAtee & Malloch, 1933

References

Further reading

 
 

Shield bugs
Articles created by Qbugbot